Lindwerder may refer to several places in Germany:

Lindwerder (Jenssen), an Anhalter civil parish of the town of Jessen
Lindwerder (Nikolassee), a Berliner islet on the river Havel
Lindwerder (Tegel), a Berliner islet on Lake Tegel